Nido is a milk substitute powder and milk powder brand manufactured by Nestlé. It was introduced in 1944 in Switzerland. The range claims to offer "nutrition solutions for each stage of childhood".

Overview 
The different varieties include instant dried whole, rather than skimmed or semi-skimmed, milk with Vitamins A & D. Nido is fortified with additional nutrients to those found in milk. Products described on the nestlenido.com Web site include Nido Fortificada (in spanish) (fortified) and a non-fat version, Nido 1+, fortified also with prebiotic fibre for children beyond early babyhood. 

Nestlé says that Nido products are not suitable for children of under 1 year of age. Although there is no age recommendation apart from the minimum age restriction of 1 year, marketing is featured around children over three years of age with the tagline "Nutritious Milk for Growing Kids".

Nido Fortificada contains: whole milk, soy lecithin, vitamins A (as acetate), C, and D3, iron (as ferric pyrophosphate), and zinc sulfate.

Nido 1+ contains: nonfat milk, vegetable oils (corn, canola, palm), sugar, maltodextrin,  lactose, milk fat, honey, prebiotics oligofructose and inulin, less than 2% calcium carbonate, soy lecithin, vitamins B6, C, D3, and K, vitamins A and E as acetate, taurine, ferrous sulfate, zinc sulfate, niacinamide,  thiamine mononitrate, folic acid, biotin, calcium pantothenate, and sodium selenate.

Nido Dry Whole Milk (product of Netherlands) contains: whole milk, soy lecithin.

Availability
Nido is available in Mexico, Asia (except Indonesia, where this milk is named "Dancow"), Middle East, most of Africa, most of South America, the UK, Portugal and some parts of the United States, particularly New York City. In some regions, the product is sold under the name "Nespray".

In Spain, however, the name Nido refers to a bird food sold by Nestlé Purina PetCare.

See also 
 Nestlé Bear Brand

References

External links
 

Nestlé brands
Milk substitutes
Powdered drink mixes
1944 establishments